Kandakovka is a rural locality (a selo) and the administrative centre of Kandakovsky Selsoviet, Kiginsky District, Bashkortostan, Russia. The population was 347 as of 2010. There are 3 streets.

Geography 
Kandakovka is located 27 km north by road of Verkhniye Kigi, the district's administrative centre. Sultanovka is the nearest rural locality.

References 

Rural localities in Kiginsky District